William Alexander Fraser (24 February 1929 – 7 March 1996) was a Scottish footballer who played for Sunderland and the Scotland national football team as a goalkeeper.

Club career
Born in Australia, Fraser started his professional footballing career with Third Lanark in 1946 and he made 63 appearances for the club until his departure to Airdrieonians in 1950. He joined Airdrie in 1950 and played for them up to 1954 and made a total of 103 appearances at his time there. He joined his third club, Sunderland, in 1954 and made his debut for them on 20 March 1954 against Tottenham Hotspur in 3–0 win at White Hart Lane. Fraser played for Sunderland from 1954 up until 1959 in that time he had made 127 appearances for the North East club. He left Sunderland and came to Nottingham Forest for one season, but played a mere two games and left for North Shields in 1959 before retiring.

International career
He won his first cap for Scotland on 16 October 1954 against Wales in a 1–0 victory at Ninian Park. He made one further appearance for his country, making a total of two caps.

See also
 List of Scotland international footballers born outside Scotland

References

1929 births
Scottish footballers
Scotland international footballers
Third Lanark A.C. players
Airdrieonians F.C. (1878) players
Sunderland A.F.C. players
Nottingham Forest F.C. players
Association football goalkeepers
1996 deaths
Scottish Football League players
English Football League players
North Shields F.C. players
Soccer players from Melbourne
Australian emigrants to Scotland